Jeevan Nedunchezhiyan and Purav Raja were the defending champions but only Nedunchezhiyan chose to defend his title, partnering Christopher Rungkat. Nedunchezhiyan lost in the semifinals to Vladyslav Manafov and Oleg Prihodko.

Zdeněk Kolář and Gonçalo Oliveira won the title after defeating Manafov and Prihodko 6–1, 7–6(7–4) in the final.

Seeds

Draw

References

External links
 Main draw

Lisboa Belém Open - Men's doubles
2022 Men's doubles